"The Enchanted Doe" is an Italian literary fairy tale written by Giambattista Basile in his 1634 work, the Pentamerone.

Synopsis

A king wished for a child; to incline the gods toward him, he was charitable to beggars.  When he had spent all his money this way without having a child, he shut himself up in a tower and shot at anyone who came near with a crossbow.  A pilgrim came and told him that if the queen ate the heart of the sea-dragon, she would have a child.  The king had this done, and the queen gave birth to identical twin boys.

One day she grew jealous of the younger, Canneloro, because the older, Fonzo, loved his brother better than her and found a place where Fonzo had been making bullets to go hunting but had left them to get something.  She took one hot bullet-mold and threw it at Canneloro, making an ugly wound, and would have thrown another, but Fonzo returned.  Canneloro told him he had to leave but, at Fonzo's persuasion, stuck a dagger in the ground, opening a fountain; he told his brother that he was well when it flowed clear, in troubles when it was turbid, and dead when it was dry.  He stuck it again, and a myrtle sprang: while he was well, it would be green, when ill, withered, and when dead, dead.  He set out.

One day he came to a tournament, won it, and so married the princess there, Fenicia.  After some time, he set out hunting, despite the king's warning of a shapeshifting ogre.  The ogre turned itself into a doe, and in the evening, asked to warm itself at the fire, begging him to tie up his dogs and sword so that it would not fear.  He did, and the ogre captured him, imprisoning him in a pit.

Fonzo found the myrtle withered and the spring troubled and set out, with two enchanted dogs.  He found the city where Canneloro had married, in mourning, and learned what had happened.  He went hunting, killed the ogre, and freed his brother.  They went back, and his wife was able to recognize Canneloro by his scar.

See also

Tale of Tales (2015 film) § The Queen
The Fisherman and His Wife
The Gold-Children
The Knights of the Fish
The Three Princes and their Beasts
The Two Brothers

External links
The Enchanted Doe

Enchanted Doe
Fiction about shapeshifting